Peterborough Crescent was a railway station serving the city of Peterborough, England. The station opened in 1858 but closed in 1866. The station was served by Midland Railway from the Ely to Peterborough Line.

Services

References

Disused railway stations in Cambridgeshire
Former Midland Railway stations
Railway stations in Great Britain opened in 1858
Railway stations in Great Britain closed in 1866